Ribno is a settlement in the Municipality of Bled in the Upper Carniola region of Slovenia.

Church

The parish church in the village is dedicated to Saint James. It was originally a Gothic church with some frescos remaining in the chancel, but it was greatly rebuilt and reconstructed in the late 19th century.

References

External links

Ribno at Geopedia

Populated places in the Municipality of Bled